Anickadu (a.k.a. Anicad or Anickad) is a village in Kottayam district in the state of Kerala, India.

Demographics
 India census, Anickadu had a population of 12733 with 6204 males and 6529 females.

References

Villages in Kottayam district